Reteporella is a genus of bryozoans in the family Phidoloporidae.

Species
Reteporella abnormis (Lu Nie & Zhong in Lu, 1991)
Reteporella abyssinica (Waters, 1909)
Reteporella alberti (Calvet, 1931)
Reteporella antarctica (Waters, 1904)
Reteporella antennata Ramalho, Muricy & Taylor, 2011
Reteporella antennula (Buchner, 1924)
Reteporella aporosa (Waters, 1895)
Reteporella aquitanica (Jullien & Calvet, 1903)
Reteporella arborea (Jullien, 1882)
Reteporella atlantica (Busk, 1884)
Reteporella aurantiaca (MacGillivray, 1883)
Reteporella aurantium Gordon, 2009
Reteporella axillaris
Reteporella beaniana (King, 1846)
Reteporella bullata (Hayward & Cook, 1979)
Reteporella carinata (MacGillivray, 1884)
Reteporella cellulosa (Linnaeus, 1767)
Reteporella clancularia Hayward & Cook, 1979
Reteporella clypeata Canu & Bassler, 1929
Reteporella complanata (Waters, 1895)
Reteporella concinna Gordon, 1984
Reteporella concinnoides Gordon & d'Hondt, 1997
Reteporella constricta (Powell, 1967)
Reteporella couchii (Hincks, 1878)
Reteporella cyclostoma (Harmer, 1934)
Reteporella defensa Gordon & d'Hondt, 1997
Reteporella dinotorhynchus Hayward & Cook, 1979
Reteporella dorsoporata Liu & Hu, 1991
Reteporella dumosa Hayward, 2000
Reteporella elegans Harmelin, 1976
Reteporella erugata Hayward, 1993
Reteporella fenestrata (Powell, 1967)
Reteporella ferox Gordon & d'Hondt, 1997
Reteporella feuerbornii (Hass, 1948)
Reteporella fimbriata Canu & Bassler, 1927
Reteporella fissa (MacGillivray, 1869)
Reteporella flabellata Busk, 1884
Reteporella frigida (Waters, 1904)
Reteporella frigidoidea (Liu & Hu, 1991)
Reteporella gelida (Waters, 1904)
Reteporella gigantea (Busk, 1884)
Reteporella gilchristi (O'Donoghue, 1924)
Reteporella gracilis Gordon, 1989
Reteporella graeffei (Kirchenpauer, 1869)
Reteporella granti Guha & Gopikrishna, 2007
Reteporella granulata (MacGillivray, 1869)
Reteporella grimaldii (Jullien, 1903)
Reteporella harmeri (Hass, 1948)
Reteporella hincksii (Kirkpatrick, 1888)
Reteporella hippocrepis (Waters, 1904)
Reteporella incognita Hayward & Ryland, 1996
Reteporella jermanensis (Waters, 1909)
Reteporella jullieni Calvet, 1931
Reteporella laciniata Hayward, 2000
Reteporella laevigata (Waters, 1904)
Reteporella lata (Busk, 1884)
Reteporella laxipes
Reteporella lepralioides (Waters, 1904)
Reteporella ligulata Gordon, 1989
Reteporella longichila Hayward, 1993
Reteporella longicollis Canu & Bassler, 1929
Reteporella longifissa (Harmer, 1934)
Reteporella magellensis (Busk, 1884)
Reteporella malleata Hayward, 2000
Reteporella malleatia Gordon, 1984
Reteporella marsupiata (Smitt, 1873)
Reteporella mediterranea Hass, 1948
Reteporella millespinae Canu & Bassler, 1929
Reteporella monomorpha Hayward, 2004
Reteporella nanshaensis (Lu, Nie & Zhong in Lu, 1991)
Reteporella obtecta (Buchner, 1924)
Reteporella parallelata Hayward, 2000
Reteporella parva Hayward, 1993
Reteporella pelecanus lopez de la Cuadra & Garcia-Gomez, 2001
Reteporella porcellana (MacGillivray, 1869)
Reteporella prominens Canu & Bassler, 1928
Reteporella protecta (Waters, 1904)
Reteporella pseudofinis Canu & Bassler, 1929
Reteporella quadripora Guha & Gopikrishna, 2007
Reteporella reginae Hayward, 2000
Reteporella reticulata (Powell, 1967)
Reteporella simplex (Waters, 1888)
Reteporella smitti Gautier, 1955
Reteporella sparteli (Calvet, 1906)
Reteporella spinosissima Canu & Bassler, 1929
Reteporella sudbournensis (Gautier, 1962)
Reteporella sudbourniensis Gautier, 1962
Reteporella suluensis (Harmer, 1934)
Reteporella syrtoxylon Gordon, 1989
Reteporella tenuitelifera Canu & Bassler, 1929
Reteporella terebrata (Buchner, 1924)
Reteporella trabeculifera Canu & Bassler, 1927
Reteporella tristis (Jullien, 1903)
Reteporella tuberosa Hayward, 2000
Reteporella unguicula Hayward, 2004
Reteporella vallata Hayward, 2000
Reteporella verecunda (Hayward & Cook, 1983)
Reteporella watersi (Nordgaard, 1907)

References

Bryozoan genera
Cheilostomatida